District 3 of the Minnesota Senate encompasses Lake and Cook counties, as well as part of St. Louis County. It is currently served by Independent Tom Bakk, who switched left the DFL caucus in mid-November of 2020.

List of senators

References 

Our Campaigns - United States - Minnesota - MN State Senate - MN State Senate 03. (2018). Ourcampaigns.com. Retrieved 2 July 2018, from https://www.ourcampaigns.com/ContainerDetail.html?ContainerID=14286

Minnesota Senate districts
Cook County, Minnesota
Lake County, Minnesota
St. Louis County, Minnesota